Caddie is an Australian film biopic directed by Donald Crombie and produced by Anthony Buckley. Released on 1 April 1976, it is representative of the Australian film renaissance which occurred during that decade. Set mainly in Sydney during the 1920s and 1930s, including the Great Depression, it portrays the life of a young middle class woman struggling to raise two children after her marriage breaks up. Based on Caddie, the Story of a Barmaid, a partly fictitious autobiography of Catherine Beatrice "Caddie" Edmonds, it made Helen Morse a local star and earned Jacki Weaver and Melissa Jaffer each an Australian Film Institute Award.

Plot
In 1925 Sydney, Caddie leaves her adulterous and brutish husband and takes her two children, Ann and Terry, with her. Forced to work as a barmaid in a pub she struggles to survive. A brief affair with Ted (Jack Thompson) ends badly when his involvement with another woman comes to light, but she falls in love with a Greek immigrant, Peter (Takis Emmanuel). Peter has to return to Greece to face family obligations–he is already married to another woman. Caddie runs out of money and goes to work as a barmaid. Peter sends letters from Greece and Caddie has to evade police as she works for an SP bookie. Peter asks her to come to Athens but she decides to stay.

Main cast
Helen Morse as Caddie Marsh
Takis Emmanuel as Peter
Jack Thompson as Ted
Jacki Weaver as Josie
Melissa Jaffer as Leslie
Ron Blanchard as Bill
Drew Forsythe as Sonny
Kirily Nolan as Esther
Lynette Curran as Maudie
June Salter as Mrs Marks
John Ewart as Paddy Reilly
 John Gaden as Solicitor
 Jane Harders as Vikki
 Phillip Hinton as Jon Marsh
 Mary Mackay as Mater
Lucky Grills as Pawnbroker
Robyn Nevin as Black Eye
Sean Hinton as Terry Marsh, aged 10
Marianne Howard as Anne Marsh, aged 7

Production
The original autobiography was published in 1953. The real-life barmaid, Catherine Edmonds, got to know Dymphna Cusack while she was writing Come in Spinner and Cusack helped the book get published.

The budget was raised from the Australian Film Development Corporation, the Australian Women's Weekly, the Nine Network, the Secretariat for International Woman's Year, and Roadshow. Shooting began in late 1975.

Parts of the movie were filmed in and around Balmain with a number of scenes at the Kent Hotel (which later became Caddies Restaurant) and the Sir William Wallace Hotel. Other scenes were filmed in Cameron Street, Edgecliff. Studio shots were taken at the Cinesound Studios in Rozelle. The writer and producer had both made films about early Australian cinema and were able to draw on this knowledge to help recreate Depression-era Sydney.

The motion picture soundtrack by Patrick Flynn was produced for release on CD by Philip Powers from the original analog tapes by 1M1 Records.

Awards
Helen Morse's performance was awarded with the Australian Film Institute's Best Actress award in 1976. Other AFI wins went for Best Actor in a Supporting Role (Drew Forsythe) and Best Actress in a Supporting Role (Melissa Jaffer and Jacki Weaver). Australian Cinematographers Society awarded Peter James the Cinematographer of the Year award in 1977. San Sebastián International Film Festival gave the Best Actress award to Helen Morse and the Special Prize of the Jury to Donald Crombie.

References

External links

Caddie at Screen Australia
1M1 Records website  release of soundtrack by Patrick Flynn
Caddie at Oz Movies
Caddie turns 40 at the National Film and Sound Archive

1976 films
Atlantic Entertainment Group films
Films set in the 1920s
Films set in the 1930s
Australian drama films
Films directed by Donald Crombie
Films set in Sydney
1976 drama films
1970s English-language films